Elvira is a female given name.

Elvira may also refer to:

Places

 Elvira, Buenos Aires, Argentina, a district of Lobos Partido
 Elvira Island, also known as Kilian Island, in Nunavut, Canada
 Elvira, an ancient administrative area/province in Visigothic and early Moorish times, now known as the Province of Granada
 Elvira, an ancient city in Spain, now called Granada
 Elvira, Illinois, United States
 Elvira, Iowa, United States

Other uses
 277 Elvira, an asteroid
 Elvira (bird), a genus of emerald hummingbirds
 Elvira (play), a 1763 play David Mallet
 "Elvira" (song), a country song recorded by many artists, most notably by the Oak Ridge Boys in 1981
 Cassandra Peterson, television personality Elvira, Mistress of the Dark
 Elvira, a genus of flowering plants now transferred to Delilia

See also
 Elvira: Mistress of the Dark (disambiguation)
 Synod of Elvira, an ecclesiastical synod held in the early 4th century AD
 Sierra Elvira, a mountain range in the southern Iberian Peninsula - see Subbaetic System
 Elmira (disambiguation)